Vladimir Andreyevich Borisenko ( born 8 September 1992), is a Ukrainian singer. He is a member of Fabrika Zirok (Star Factory-3) and Ukrayina maye talant  (Ukraine's Got Talent)projects.

Biography
Vladimir is better known by the alternative spelling of Vova. He is best known for being a member of the boyband Borisenko Brothers, along with his twin brother Alexander Borisenko. They took part in the first season of the show Ukrayina maye talant. Later, in autumn 2009, they participated in the Fabrika Zirok|. They obtained fourth place from the result of audience, behind Serzi Nicholas, Alex Mathias and Stas Shurins.

Borisenko Brothers discography

Songs
"Zvezdnyj Bereg"
"Pust'ya Malen'kogo Rosta"
"Koldovala Zima"
"Ya Geroj"
"Lyubov's pervogo vzgljada"
"Ona"
"Nebo plachet"
"Mama"
"Stop"
"Ne Trogay Moy Pleer"
"Ya Prosto Schastliv"
"Na miliony odna"

Singles
2009 "Ne Trogay Moy Pleer»
2011 "Pust'ya Malen'kogo Rosta»
2010 "Koldovala Zima»
2011 "Мама"
2011 "Lyubov' s pervogo vzgljada"
2012 "Ya Prosto Schastliv"
2012 "Nu Chto Tu Hochesh?"

Videos
2010 Koldovala Zima
2011 Ljubov S Pervogo
2012 Ya Prosto Schastliv
2012 Nu Chto Tu Hochesh?

References

External links

Living people
Ukrainian pop singers
Musicians from Dnipro
1992 births
21st-century Ukrainian singers